The Bellflower Unified School District is a school district in Los Angeles County, California.  It serves the city of  Bellflower as well as portions of Cerritos and Lakewood.

List of schools

Middle/High schools
Bellflower High School
Mayfair High School
Somerset High School

Elementary schools
 Albert Baxter Elementary School
 Stephen Foster Elementary School
 Intensive Learning Center
 Thomas Jefferson Elementary School
 Las Flores Elementary School
 Esther Lindstrom Elementary School
 Ernie Pyle Elementary School
 Ramona Elementary School
 Washington Elementary School
 Craig Williams Elementary School
 Frank E. Woodruff Elementary School

Adult Schools
 Bellflower Adult School

See also

List of school districts in Los Angeles County, California

External links
Bellflower Unified School District website

School districts in Los Angeles County, California
Bellflower, California
Cerritos, California
Lakewood, California